The Journey to Tilsit (German: Die Reise nach Tilsit) is a 1939 German drama film directed by Veit Harlan and starring Kristina Söderbaum, Philip Dorn and Anna Dammann.

Synopsis
Elske faithfully loves her husband Endrik as he is seduced by a foreign schemer, Madlyn. Madlyn persuades him to murder Elske and run off with her. He lures Elske into the boat as a prelude to drowning her. Though he is unable to carry it out, she realizes his intent. When they reach the shore, she flees to the city of Tilsit, and he follows to plead for forgiveness. They return, and a storm blows up while they are in the boat. Endrik gets ashore, but believes Elske to have drowned. He reacts with anger to Madlyn, but learns that Elske did survive.

Cast
  Kristina Söderbaum as Elske Settegast
 Philip Dorn as Endrik Settegast
 Anna Dammann as Madlyn Sapierska 
 Albert Florath as Lehrer 
 Ernst Legal as Herr Wittkuhn 
 Manny Ziener as Frau Papendieck 
 Charlotte Schultz as Frau Wittkuhn 
 Eduard von Winterstein as Erwin Bohrmann
 Clemens Hasse as Junger Mann aus der Straßenbahn 
 Jakob Tiedtke as Gastwirt 
 Paul Westermeier as Ausrufer 
 Wolfgang Kieling as Klein Franz 
 Joachim Pfaff as Klein Jons
 Heinz Dugall as Klein Wittkuhn 
 Babsi Schultz-Reckewell as Mariechen
 Lotte Spira as Frau im Café 
 Eduard Wenck as Dorfbewohner
 Alfred Karen as Besitzer des Pelzgeschäfts 
 Heinz Müller as Dicker Mann auf dem Jahrmarkt 
 Ferdinand Robert as Gast im Cafe in Tilsit 
 Betty Waid as Alte Frau aus dem Dorf 
 Max Wilmsen as Begleiter, der Frau im Cafe 
 Bruno Ziener as Ober im Cafe

Motifs
Elske, as is typical for Kristina Söderbaum's roles, is a model of patient, virtuous and old-fashioned wifehood and of pure and healthy Aryan stock, stemming from her country living, whereas her rival is Polish, promiscuous, and city-dwelling, an obvious product of "asphalt culture". Her victory reflected a need to avoid temptation to adultery, when many families were separated.

Production
The film is a sound remake of the 1927 silent film Sunrise: A Song of Two Humans, which was based on Hermann Sudermann's 1917 short story "The Excursion to Tilsit", from the collection with the same title. Harlan maintained it was a true film, whereas Sunrise was only a poem, and it did avoid the symbols and soft focus of that film for more realism. It was shot at the Johannisthal Studios in Berlin and on location in Memel, where the action takes place.

Premiere
Magda Goebbels ostentatiously left the premiere, owing to the accidental resemblance between it and her own situation, where Joseph Goebbels carried on with the Czech actress Lída Baarová.  (It was similarly resolved, with the actress being sent back to Czechoslovakia, and Hitler himself informing Goebbels that there would be no divorce.)

Citations

References

Further reading
 Hake, Sabine. German National Cinema. Routledge, 2013.

External links
 

1939 films
Films of Nazi Germany
1930s German-language films
Films based on works by Hermann Sudermann
Films directed by Veit Harlan
1939 drama films
German drama films
Remakes of American films
Sound film remakes of silent films
Tobis Film films
Films shot at Johannisthal Studios
German black-and-white films
1930s German films